Dalton Castle is a grade I listed 14th-century peel tower situated in Dalton-in-Furness, Cumbria, England, and in the ownership of the National Trust.  It was constructed by the monks of Furness Abbey for the protection of the nearby market town, and was the building from which the Abbot administered the area and dispensed justice.

It was a prison from at least 1257, until 1774.

The property hosts an exhibition on a local history as well as a display about local painter George Romney.

See also

Listed buildings in Dalton Town with Newton

References

External links
Dalton Castle information at the National Trust
The Cumbria Directory - Dalton Castle

Houses completed in the 14th century
Towers completed in the 14th century
Castles in Cumbria
Peel towers in Cumbria
National Trust properties in Cumbria
Grade I listed buildings in Cumbria
Grade I listed castles
Scheduled monuments in Cumbria
Museums in Cumbria
Local museums in Cumbria
Dalton-in-Furness
Defunct prisons in England
Debtors' prisons